Shanghai II: Dragon's Eye is a 1990 video game published by Activision.

Gameplay
Shanghai II: Dragon's Eye is a game in which one player builds a pile of tiles in the shape of a dragon while the other player tries to slay the dragon by removing matching tiles. The game's mechanics are based upon Mahjong solitaire.

Reception
Alan Emrich reviewed the game for Computer Gaming World, and stated that "the gamers are fortunate that the work is done and now they can relax enjoy playing Shanghai II either solitaire or with a friend. Even with some flaws in execution, the concepts in scope and grandeur that sired Shanghai II are those worthy of the highest praise. Well done, Activision. Well done."

Amaya Lopez for Zero rated the game at 83 and said that Shanghai II offers nothing rivetingly new, but if you're into puzzle games (particularly of an oriental nature) you'll love this one.

Reviews
PC Gamer - Dec, 1994
PC Games - Feb, 1995
ASM (Aktueller Software Markt) - May, 1993
PC Player (Germany) - Aug, 1994

References

1990 video games
Activision games
Apple IIGS games
Classic Mac OS games
DOS games
FM Towns games
MSX games
NEC PC-9801 games
Sega Genesis games
Super Nintendo Entertainment System games
Windows games
X68000 games